Count to Ten is a 1985 Argentine drama film directed by Oscar Barney Finn. It was selected to compete for the Golden Bear at the 35th Berlin International Film Festival.

Cast
 Oscar Martínez
 Héctor Alterio
 Arturo Maly as Pedro Vallejos
 María Luisa Robledo
 Julia von Grolman
 Eva Franco
 Arturo Puig
 Selva Alemán
 Olga Zubarry
 China Zorrilla

References

External links

1985 films
1980s Spanish-language films
1985 drama films
Films directed by Oscar Barney Finn
Argentine drama films
1980s Argentine films